Surkh (Tajik and Russian: Сурх) is a village and jamoat in northern Tajikistan. It is part of the city of Isfara in Sughd Region. The jamoat has a total population of 14,456 (2015).

References

Populated places in Sughd Region
Jamoats of Tajikistan